Oto Jurģis (12 July 1904 – 7 October 1973) was a Latvian athlete. He competed in the men's javelin throw at the 1936 Summer Olympics.

References

1904 births
1973 deaths
Athletes (track and field) at the 1936 Summer Olympics
Latvian male javelin throwers
Olympic athletes of Latvia
Place of birth missing